Isabella Rauti (born 17 November 1962) is an Italian academic and politician.

Biography 
Daughter of the former leader of the Italian Social Movement Pino Rauti, she graduated in Letters and in Pedagogy at the LUMSA University in Rome, obtaining a few time later a PhD in Pedagogy.

Political career 
When she was very young, she joined the Italian Social Movement. In 1995, with the end of the party, she followed her father in the far-right party Tricolour Flame, with which she ran for the office of Mayor of Rome at the 2001 local elections: she ranked sixth and was not elected. Three years later, in 2004, she joined Gianfranco Fini's National Alliance.

After AN merged into The People of Freedom, Rauti has been elected to the regional council of Lazio at the 2010 regional election, supporting the centre-right candidate Renata Polverini, who is elected President of Lazio.

With the end of PdL, Rauti joined Giorgia Meloni's right-wing party Brothers of Italy, with which she is elected to the Italian Senate at the 2018 general election, representing the single-member district of Mantua.

Personal life 
Rauti has been married with former Mayor of Rome Gianni Alemanno from 1992 to 2018. The couple has a son, Manfredi, born in 1995.

References

External links 
Files about her parliamentary activities (in Italian): XVIII legislature.

1962 births
Living people
Italian Social Movement politicians
Tricolour Flame politicians
National Alliance (Italy) politicians
The People of Freedom politicians
Brothers of Italy politicians
21st-century Italian women politicians
20th-century Italian women
Libera Università Maria SS. Assunta alumni